The 2012–13 Bundesliga was the 50th season of the Bundesliga, Germany's premier football league. The season began on 24 August 2012 with the season opening match at Westfalenstadion involving defending champions Borussia Dortmund and SV Werder Bremen and ended with the last games on 18 May 2013, with a winter break between the weekends around 15 December 2012 and 19 January 2013. Bayern Munich managed to secure the championship of the 2012–13 season after only 28 match days, beating their previous record by two matches.

The league comprises eighteen teams: The best fifteen teams of the 2011–12 season, the best two teams from the 2011–12 2. Bundesliga and the winners of the relegation play-off between the 16th-placed Bundesliga team and the third-placed 2. Bundesliga team.

Teams
1. FC Köln and 1. FC Kaiserslautern were relegated to the 2012–13 2. Bundesliga after finishing in one of the bottom two spots of the table at the end of the 2011–12 season. Köln were relegated to the second level after four Bundesliga seasons, while Kaiserslautern ended a two-year tenure in the top flight.

The two relegated teams will be replaced by SpVgg Greuther Fürth and Eintracht Frankfurt. Greuther Fürth will make their Bundesliga debut while also returning to the top level after 49 seasons, as predecessors SpVgg Fürth missed out on qualification for the Bundesliga at the end of the 1962–63 season. In turn, Eintracht Frankfurt make an immediate comeback to the league after being relegated at the end of the 2010–11 season.

A further place in the league was determined by a two-legged play-off between Hertha BSC, the 16th-placed team of the 2011–12 season, and Fortuna Düsseldorf, the third-placed team of the 2011–12 2. Bundesliga. Düsseldorf won the play-off by 4–3 on aggregate; the club returned to the top level after 15 years in lower levels of the league pyramid. Hertha made only a cameo appearance in the league and immediately dropped back to the 2. Bundesliga.

Stadiums and locations
Promotees SpVgg Greuther Fürth expanded the capacity of their Trolli Arena to 18,000 spectators in order to guarantee all matches of the campaign being played at their own ground. Bayern Munich also expanded the capacity of their Allianz Arena by 2,000 people; the new total capacity for the ground is 71,000 spectators.

Personnel and kits
Borussia Dortmund changed their kit suppliers from Kappa to Puma, signing a contract through the 2019–20 season with the German sports brand. Furthermore, a couple of shirt sponsoring contracts were not renewed. VfB Stuttgart replaced the Gazi brand of dairy product company garmo with the banking section of automobile company Mercedes-Benz as their new shirt sponsors, and Fortuna Düsseldorf changed from home retail chain Bauhaus to discount phone company o.tel.o.

Three further clubs finalized new sponsoring contracts shortly before the first matches were played. Fraport chose not to renew their contract with Eintracht Frankfurt; the Hessian club announced a deal with brewery Krombacher at the end of July. Elsewhere, the agreements between 1. FC Nürnberg and Areva and between Werder Bremen and Targobank expired. Werder announced their new main sponsor to be poultry giant Wiesenhof in early August 2012, despite prolonged protests due to the company's suspected animal abuse. Finally, Nürnberg agreed to a multi-year contract with clothing retailers NKD just days before the start of the season.

Managerial changes

League table

Results

Relegation play-offs
1899 Hoffenheim as the 16th-placed team faced the 3rd-placed 2012–13 2. Bundesliga side 1. FC Kaiserslautern in a two-legged play-off.

1899 Hoffenheim won 5–2 on aggregate and retained its Bundesliga spot for the 2013–14 season.

Season statistics

Top scorers

Hat-tricks

 4 Player scored 4 goals

Number of teams by state

References

External links

  

Bundesliga seasons
1
Germany